The 2015 Russian Circuit Racing Series season was the second season of the Russian Circuit Racing Series, organized by SMP Racing. It was the first season with TCR class cars, competing alongside the Super 2000 TC2 and the Super Production cars. It is also included Touring Light, National and Junior's championships, with all of them have their own races during the RCRS weekends. Aleksey Dudukalo won the drivers' championship, driving a SEAT Leon Cup Racer, and Lukoil Racing Team won the teams' championship.

Teams and drivers
All teams and drivers were Russian-registered, excepting Mika Salo, who raced under Finnish Racing license.

Touring Absolute (United S2000)

Touring Light

National

Junior

Calendar and results
The 2015 calendar consists in seven rounds, with all events scheduled to be held in Russia. The fifth round was scheduled to be held in Autodrom Moscow, but it was later moved to Smolensk Ring. The seventh round was scheduled to be held in Sochi Autodrom, but it was later moved to Kazan Ring.

Championship standings
Scoring system

Touring and Super Production

† – Drivers did not finish the race, but were classified as they completed over 75% of the race distance.

Teams' Championship

† – Drivers did not finish the race, but were classified as they completed over 75% of the race distance.

Touring Light

National

Junior

References

External links
  

Russian Circuit Racing Series
Russian Circuit Racing Series
Russian Circuit Racing Series